On March 29, 2001, a chartered Gulfstream III business jet operated by Avjet from Los Angeles, California, to Aspen, Colorado, crashed into the ground while on final approach. All three crew members and 15 passengers on board perished.

The subsequent investigation  by the National Transportation Safety Board concluded that the cause of the accident was the captain's premature descent below the minimum descent altitude, carried out without having the runway in sight.

The accident's investigation also brought into focus several generic safety issues, such as pressure applied on charter pilots by customers, night flight into airports near mountainous terrain, and the ambiguity of some Federal Aviation Administration rules.

Flight history
Captain Robert Frisbie (44) and First Officer Peter Kowalczyk (38) reported for work at Avjet's Burbank, California facility around noon on the day of the accident. After checking the weather and the aircraft, they embarked on an 11-minute repositioning flight to Los Angeles International Airport (LAX) to pick up their passengers. The flight was originally scheduled to leave LAX at 16:30 MST, but departed after a 41-minute delay for late passengers at 17:11 MST.

Earlier in the day, an FAA specialist had informed the crew that it would be illegal to land at night in Aspen under instrument flight rules. In addition, the crew were aware that due to noise abatement restrictions, their jet aircraft was required to land at Aspen by the 18:58 MST night curfew. Following the delayed departure from LAX, their estimated arrival time was 18:46 MST, twelve minutes before the curfew took effect.

As the flight approached Aspen–Pitkin County Airport, it became evident that some of the other inbound flights were performing missed approaches, as they had been unable to complete an instrument approach to the airport's runway. The airport is surrounded by high terrain on all sides and a fairly steep descent is required in order to land.

At 18:56:06 MST, the flight was cleared for the VOR/DME-C instrument approach to the airport, whereupon it proceeded to the Red Table VOR, executed a sequence of designated step-down maneuvers and began final approach to the runway. As it continued its descent past the missed approach point – where the runway must be in sight to continue – the pilots had still not visually located the runway in the increasing darkness and snow showers. At 19:01:57 MST, while in a steep left bank, the aircraft crashed into the terrain, killing all 18 persons on board.

Investigation and final report 

Following the crash, the aircraft's cockpit voice recorder was recovered from the wreckage and the data recorded found to be intact and usable. Under Code of Federal Regulations (CFR) Part 135 Air Taxi rules, no flight data recorder was required for this type of flight and one had not been installed.

Part of the subsequent NTSB investigation focused on the fact that the instrument approach at the destination airport was not legal for night landing, and the overall pressure applied on the charter company and flight crew by the charter customer to complete the flight into the original destination. According to witnesses, the charter customer, upon learning that the flight might have to be diverted to an alternate airport due to the night landing restriction, had his business assistant call Avjet management, to "let them know that the airplane was not going to be redirected".

In addition, witnesses claimed that when the charter customer learned that the captain had discussed the possible diversion with some of the passengers waiting for the late arrivals, he had his assistant call Avjet to instruct the captain to "keep his comments to himself".

The Avjet charter department scheduler subsequently testified that "the captain felt that it was important to land at [Aspen] because of the substantial amount of money that the [charter] customer spent for a dinner party".

Based on information obtained from the cockpit voice recorder, the flight attendant had escorted an unidentified male passenger to the flight deck's jump seat during the approach sequence. According to the NTSB's analysis, "the presence of this passenger in the cockpit, especially if it were the charter customer, most likely further heightened the pressure on the flight crew to land at [Aspen]".

The NTSB issued its final report on June 11, 2002, with the following probable cause:
The National Transportation Safety Board determines that the probable cause of this accident was the flight crew's operation of the airplane below the minimum descent altitude without an appropriate visual reference for the runway.

The NTSB added the following contributing factors:
Contributing to the cause of the accident were the Federal Aviation Administration's (FAA) unclear wording of the March 27, 2001 Notice to Airmen regarding the nighttime restriction for the VOR/DME-C approach to the airport and the FAA's failure to communicate this restriction to the Aspen tower; the inability of the flight crew to adequately see the mountainous terrain because of the darkness and the
weather conditions; and the pressure on the captain to land from the charter customer and because of the airplane's delayed departure and the airport's nighttime landing restriction.

Aftermath
After the accident, Avjet decided to prohibit airport operations at Aspen and three other mountainous airports between sunset and sunrise. It also issued the following memorandum to its flight crews and schedulers:
"if you cannot accomplish a landing and be on the ground at one of these airports before sunset you must divert to a suitable alternate. All passengers for one of these destinations must be informed of this policy. Flight crew members must report any violation of this policy or pressure from passengers to violate this policy to the Director of Operations or Chief Pilot."

Avjet also added the following policy to its operations manual after the accident:
"Only an Avjet assigned crewmember, check airman, or FAA observer may occupy the observer's seat (jump seat) in any Avjet aircraft. Charter passengers shall never be allowed to occupy the observer's seat at any time."

Litigation 
A wrongful death lawsuit was filed by the families of three of the victims in Los Angeles. After a jury found the captain and Avjet Corporation negligent, an out-of-court settlement was reached, where Avjet agreed to pay the plaintiffs a total of US$11.7M in damages. There were reportedly also other settlements for other victims.

See also 
List of accidents and incidents on commercial aircraft

References

Further reading
Christina Ward, "Charter Plane Crash Kills 18 Near Aspen", RedCross.org, March 30, 2001
Gordon Gilbert, "Fuel and weather suspect in Aspen GIII accident", AIN Online, November 2001
Gordon Gilbert, "Editors' Choice: Gulfstream III crew in Aspen crash" AIN Online, January 2002

External links 
Avjet Corporation
CNN Rush Transcript on accident
GoogleMaps aerial photo of KASE airport
AirNav record for KASE – note 'Additional Remarks'
Airliners.net Photo of accident aircraft N303GA, on June 2, 2000 in Budapest, Hungary

Aviation accidents and incidents in the United States in 2001
Aviation accidents and incidents in Colorado
Pitkin County, Colorado
2001 in Colorado
Airliner accidents and incidents involving controlled flight into terrain
Airliner accidents and incidents caused by pilot error
March 2001 events in the United States